Tomato soup is a soup with tomatoes as the primary ingredient. It can be served hot or cold, and may be made in a variety of ways.  It may be smooth in texture, and there are also recipes that include chunks of tomato, cream, chicken or vegetable stock, vermicelli, chunks of other vegetables and meatballs. Many companies have their own versions of tomato soup which all vary in taste, portions and ingredients.

History
The first published tomato soup is mentioned by Eliza Leslie in 1857 in her final publication New Cookery Book. Joseph Campbell's recipe for condensed tomato soup in 1897 further increased its popularity.

Traditional tomato soup
It can be made fresh by blanching tomatoes, removing the skins, then blending them into a puree. In Poland it is commonly prepared with tomato paste, chicken broth and sour cream. The soup is not "creamed" and contains pieces of vegetables such as carrots, parsley root, celery root, etc. It might be served with pasta or rice. The soup is often based on rosół that was cooked a few days earlier and hasn't been eaten. This way of cooking tomato soup and its popularity became an inside joke amongst Poles.

Gazpacho

Gazpacho is a tomato soup of Spanish origin, served cold. It originates in the region of Andalucía in southern Spain. Gazpacho is widely consumed in Spanish cuisine, as well as in neighboring Portugal, where it is known as gaspacho. Gazpacho is mostly consumed during the summer months, due to its refreshing qualities and cold serving temperature. Many variations of gazpacho exist.

Tomato borscht

Some kinds of borscht are made with tomatoes since XIX century: tomatoes are tart enough to resemble beet sour or hogweed sour, found in ancient types of borscht.

Industrial tomato soup
Commercially prepared tomato soup is available in a variety of forms including preserved, condensed and in dehydrated powder form. Industrial tomato soup may be canned or come in a large drink carton or bag. "Tomato" ranks among the top three flavors of soup produced by the Campbell Soup Company.

Industrial tomato soup is primarily tomato puree: that is, tomato paste and water with a few other ingredients added to enhance flavor and physical properties of the food.

The tomato is a high acid food therefore, "the tomato is not considered a high-risk food, as the pH of the fruit generally ranges from pH 4.2–4.9 with an average of about 4.5. At this point pathogens are unlikely to grow". However, there are still some foodborne pathogens that can pose as a major problem when it comes to the safety of the food and its shelf life stability. The main concern when canning is anaerobic microorganisms that produce toxins like Clostridium botulinum. Even though the tomato is a high acid food it still falls in the range where this organism can grow and produce toxin pH 4.6–8.5 with an optimum growing temperature between 30 and 40 °C and a maximum temperature of 50 °C. Even if the bacteria are killed they release heat resistant spores that if they start to multiply become a threat.

The cell wall structural importance for the plant's growth and stability in the ripening process is equally important to the quality of the tomato products it can produce. The pectin and cellulose are what determine the apparent viscosity of the tomato product. If they are broken at higher temperatures more enzymes are deactivated than if they are broken at lower temperatures.

See also
 List of cream soups
 List of soups
 List of tomato dishes

References

Further reading

External links

 Several recipes for tomato soup
 Heart-healthy tomato soup recipe
 How to make tomato soup
 Rassam - Indian tomato Soup from Andhra Pradesh

American soups
Polish soups
Soups
Vegetable dishes
Tomato dishes
Vegetable soups